Turo Asplund (born 8 June 1985) is a Finnish professional ice hockey player currently playing for Sport of the Finnish Liiga.

Asplund made his SM-liiga debut playing with JYP during the 2009–10 SM-liiga season.

References

External links

1985 births
Finnish ice hockey centres
Mikkelin Jukurit players
JYP Jyväskylä players
Living people
Sportspeople from Jyväskylä
Ilves players
Lukko players
21st-century Finnish people